Geosmithia is a genus of anamorphic fungi of uncertain familial placement in the order Hypocreales. The genus, circumscribed by Australian mycologist John Pitt in 1979, is widely distributed. A 2008 estimate placed ten species in the genus, but several new species have since been described. Thousand cankers disease, which affects economically important black walnut (Juglans nigra) populations in North America, is caused by Geosmithia morbida.

Species in the genus are generally similar to those in Penicillium, but can be distinguished from them by forming cylindrical conidia from rough-walled phialides. Additionally, the conidia of Geosmithia do not have a green color, in contrast to the characteristic blue-grey or green-grey conidia of Penicillium. Some Geosmithia species have teleomorphic forms that are classified in the genus Talaromyces. However, Geosmithia is a polyphyletic taxon with evolutionary affinities to at least three groups of the euascomycete lineage within the Ascomycota. The generic name Geosmithia honors British mycologist George Smith.

Species
As accepted by Species Fungorum;
Geosmithia brunnea 
Geosmithia carolliae 
Geosmithia cnesini 
Geosmithia eburnea 
Geosmithia emersonii 
Geosmithia eupagioceri 
Geosmithia fassatiae 
Geosmithia flava 
Geosmithia langdonii 
Geosmithia lavendula 
Geosmithia malachitea 
Geosmithia microcorthyli 
Geosmithia morbida 
Geosmithia namyslowskii 
Geosmithia obscura 
Geosmithia omnicola Pepori 
Geosmithia proliferans 
Geosmithia putterillii 
Geosmithia rufescens 
Geosmithia swiftii 
Geosmithia tibetensis 
Geosmithia ulmacea 
Geosmithia xerotolerans 

Former species;
 G. argillacea  = Rasamsonia argillacea Aspergillaceae family
 G. cylindrospora  = Rasamsonia cylindrospora Aspergillaceae
 G. pallida  = Geosmithia putterillii
 G. viridis  = Talaromyces viridulus Aspergillaceae

References

External links
 

 
Hypocreales incertae sedis
Sordariomycetes genera